An Arctic roll is a British ice cream cake made of vanilla ice cream wrapped in a thin layer of sponge cake to form a roll, with a layer of raspberry flavoured sauce between the sponge and the ice cream.

History
The dessert was invented in the 1950s by Dr. Ernest Velden, an immigrant from then Czechoslovakia. He set up a factory in Eastbourne producing Arctic Roll in 1968, and the dessert soon became a successful product. However, sales slumped during the 1990s and eventually the manufacturer of Arctic roll, Birds Eye, stopped producing the dessert. The 2008 economic downturn saw the reappearance of Arctic roll as consumers increasingly looked for low-cost foods.

While some consumers view the Arctic Roll as comfort food, others view it as old fashioned and the food writer Nigel Slater has even described it as tasting of "frozen carpet". Nonetheless, Birds Eye reported "overwhelming consumer demand" for the dessert. Commentators suggest that aside from Arctic Roll's low price, many consumers buy the dessert out of feelings of nostalgia. A number of UK supermarkets sell their own brand versions of Arctic Roll, both chocolate and raspberry variants, and did so even when Birds Eye were not marketing the product.

Flavours
The original Arctic Roll features vanilla ice cream and raspberry jam; Birds Eye also produce a variant using chocolate ice cream.

References

British desserts
Frozen desserts
Ice cream
Sponge cakes
Stuffed desserts
Brand name desserts